Vlorë County is one of the 12 counties of the Republic of Albania with the capital in Vlorë. The county spans  and has a total population of 187,675 people as of 2021. It borders the counties of Fier and Gjirokastër, as well as the Adriatic and Ionian Sea.

Vlorë is geographically a very mountainous county. The county stretches along the Adriatic Sea and especially the Ionian Sea, forming the Albanian Riviera. The coasts on the west can be very steep and rocky with green panoramic vistas and high mountains in the hinterland, including the Ceraunian Mountains. The northwest of the county is mostly located on the peninsula of Karaburun, with a rough relief, steep cliffs, bays and rocky beaches.

With more than 187,000 inhabitants in 2021, the county is the sixth most populous county within Albania, and the third most populous within the Southern Region. Albanians constitute the ethnic majority of the county, including the capital. Greeks, Aromanians, & a few Roma also are present in the ethnic composition of the county.

The port city of Vlorë is the capital of Vlorë County. It is where the Albanian Declaration of Independence was proclaimed on November 28, 1912. The Butrint National Park, Llogara National Park and Karaburun Sazan National Marine Park are located in Vlorë County. The ancient city of Butrint is an archeological site in Vlorë County, some 14 kilometres south of Sarandë. It is located on a hill overlooking the Vivari Channel and is part of the Butrint National Park.

History 

During antiquity, the city of Vlorë, the homonymous county capital, was known as Aulón (meaning channel or glen, and possibly a translation of another indigenous name). The city was founded as a Greek colony within the territory of Illyria. The Latin name is Aulona, a Latinization of the Ancient Greek name. The medieval and modern Greek name was Αυλώνας /av'lonas/, accusative Αυλώνα /av'lona/, and is the source of the Italian name Valona and of the obsolete English Avlona. During the Ottoman era, the Turkish Avlonya was also common.

The region was also inhabited by the Greek tribe of the Chaonians in classical antiquity. The Ancient Greeks developed the town of Sarandë, which they referred to as Onchesmos (or Anchiasmos). Onchesmos flourished as the port of the Chaonian capital of Phoenice (modern-day Finiq). Another Chaonian settlement was Chimera, identified with Himarë, while the Corinthians founded the colony of Aulon at the bay of Vlorë. Additional ancient settlements in the region included Thronium, Amantia and  Oricum. Illyrian tribes were located north of the mouth of Aoos, which is located near the northern limits of the county.

In the Middle Ages, the region was part of the Byzantine Empire, while during the Slavic invasion there is evidence that Byzantine rule was maintained in the area.

In 1204 the region became part of the Despotate of Epirus, but later returned to the Byzantine Empire. In 1335 Albanian tribes descended south and were in possession of the area between Berat and the bay of Vlorë, while in 1345 after the Serbian invasion an independent principality was formed in Vlorë.

In the middle of the 14th century the aristocratic Delvina family ruled Delvinë, and in 1354 Mehmet Ali Pasha Delvina was testified as the owner of the castle and the city.

Geography

Location 

Vlorë is one of the twelve counties of Albania located in the east, south and southwest of the Southern Region. The county lies between latitudes 41° N, and longitudes 20° E. It measures an area of  placing it the fifth largest in Albania and the third largest in the Southern Region, behind Korçë County and Gjirokastër County. It is bordered by the counties of Fier to the north and Gjirokastër to the east, the country of Greece to the south and the Adriatic Sea in the northwest, as well as the Ionian Sea in the west.

The county of Vlorë is divided into seven municipalities; Delvinë, Finiq, Himarë, Konispol, Sarandë, Selenicë and Vlorë. The municipalities are further subdivided into 200 towns and villages in total.

 
In Vlorë, there are five islands, notably the Ksamil Islands. The combined areas of the four Ksamil islands measure only , and forms part of the larger Butrint National Park.

In addition to being the largest island in Albania, it is a military facility and sometimes in clear weather it may be seen by eye from the coast of Salento, Italy. More than half of the island's surrounding marine area forms part of the Karaburun-Sazan National Marine Park. Stillo Island is rocky and sparsely vegetated. It has an area of half an hectare, with an approximate length of 80 meters and a width of 100 meters. It is located in the Ionian Sea, 200 meters off the coast of Cape Stillo. Tongo Island is a rocky island, its waters rich in aquatic life. The island is situated about 300 metres (984 feet) off the Greek coast. It has an area of 2.5 hectares (6.2 acres). The Zvërnec Islands are two islands located in Narta Lagoon. The larger island is nearly completely covered with tall pine trees and is connected to the mainland by a 270m long wooden bridge.
It is 430m in length and 300m in width. It has an area of around 8.8 hectares. The smaller island has a smaller vegetation, being 230m in length and 100m in width, with an area of little more than 1 hectare.

Biodiversity 
 
Phytogeographically, the county completely falls within the Illyrian deciduous forests terrestrial ecoregion of the Palearctic Mediterranean forests, woodlands, and scrub.

Protected areas 

The county of Vlorë has many ecosystems. Within the county there are three national parks, namely Llogara National Park, Karaburun-Sazan Marine Park and Butrint National Park.

Demographics 

The population of Vlorë, as defined by the Institute of Statistics of Albania, was estimated in 2011 to be 175,640. The census results have been widely disputed due to irregularities in the procedure and by the boycott. Ethnic groups include Albanians, as well as minorities of Greeks, Aromanians, Roma, Egyptians

Islam is the predominant religion in the county. In 2011, 42.14% of the population declared themselves as Muslim. Christianity is the second largest religion, claiming 15.72% of the total population. This includes Orthodox, Evangelist and Roman Catholic believers. Bektashism comprises less than two per cent of the county's population with 1,903 adherents.

The most densely populated areas are the coastal cities of Vlorë, Sarandë and Himarë, while vast regions, such as the highlands, are very sparsely populated.

Economy 

Vlorë County has the second highest human development after Tirana County, and has a High Human Development Rating within Albania.

The county remains a major seaport and commercial centre, with a significant fishing and industrial sector. The city of Vlorë is the economic hub of the county. The surrounding region of the city is mainly agricultural and pastoral; a large producer of petroleum, natural gas, bitumen and salt. Vlorë has grown in importance as an agricultural center with large-scale planting of olive and citrus fruit trees, and as a center of the food processing, oil and bitumen export industries.

According to the World Bank, Vlorë has made significant steps in the ease of starting a business in 2016. It ranks seventh among 22 cities in Southeastern Europe, being placed higher than the capital Tirana, Belgrade and Sarajevo.

Tourism has become a major industry in recent years, with many hotels, recreational centers, and vast beaches. In Sarandë, tourism is the main driver of the economy. It is a significant tourist destination on the Ionian Sea, and by far one of the most popular destinations in Albania. Vlorë County is considered a prosperous region, one with varied attractions, plants and mountains, rivers and lakes, springs and virgin beaches, citrus plantations, olive groves and vineyards, pastures and woods, fish and shellfish farming and desirable hunting places.

In short, Vlorë County's location is advantageous in terms of development of tourism. Sarandë's stony beaches are respectable, and there are plenty of sights in and around town, including the ancient archaeological site of Butrint and the hypnotic Blue Eye Spring.

See also 

 Geography of Albania
 Politics of Albania
 Divisions of Albania

References 

 

 
Vlorë